Diorhabda is a genus of beetles in the family Chrysomelidae. The beetles feed on Tamarix (tamarisk or saltcedar) The genus is native to Europe and Asia, but several species have been intentionally introduced to North America as biological control agents for Tamarix. Common names include tamarisk beetle and saltcedar leaf beetle.

Species include:
Diorhabda carinata (Faldermann, 1837)
Diorhabda carinulata (Desbrochers, 1869)
Diorhabda elongata (Brullé, 1832)
Diorhabda fischeri (Faldermann, 1837)
Diorhabda meridionalis Berti & Rapilly, 1973
Diorhabda octocostata Gahan, 1896
Diorhabda persica (Faldermann, 1837)
Diorhabda sublineata (Lucas, 1849)

References

Galerucinae
Chrysomelidae genera
Taxa named by Julius Weise